Christian Schreider (born 22 December 1971) is a German politician of the Social Democratic Party (SPD) who has been serving as a member of the Bundestag since 2021.

Early life and education
Schreider was born 1971 in the West German city of Worms and studied law.

Political career
Schreider entered the SPD in 1998 and became member of the Bundestag in 2021. In parliament, he has since been serving on the Committee on Transport and the Sports Committee.

Other activities
 Federal Network Agency for Electricity, Gas, Telecommunications, Posts and Railway (BNetzA), Member of the Rail Infrastructure Advisory Council (since 2022)
 German United Services Trade Union (ver.di), Member

References 

Living people
1971 births
Social Democratic Party of Germany politicians
Members of the Bundestag 2021–2025
21st-century German politicians